Tatoi was the summer palace and  estate of the former Greek royal family. The area is a densely wooded southeast-facing slope of Mount Parnitha, and its ancient and current official name is Dekeleia. It is located  from the city centre of Athens.

Development of the estate and ownership disputes

King George I of the Hellenes obtained the estate during the 1880s, purchasing it with private funds he had brought from Denmark. In 1916, during the First World War, the house was burned down.

During the Republican regime in the 1920s, most of the estate was confiscated from its owners, but in 1936 it was returned to King George II of the Hellenes following the monarchy's restoration.

During the Second World War, when the King was in exile and Greeks suffered considerable hardships under German occupation, the woods at Tatoi were chopped down for fuel and corpses were buried in shallow graves.

King George II regained possession of the estate in 1946. It passed down as private property to King Constantine II until 1994, when the royal estates were confiscated by the government of Andreas Papandreou. Constantine took the matter to the European Court of Human Rights, who ruled in his favour in 2003. They were not able to force the return of the estates, but they were able to legally force the government to pay him €12m in compensation; this amounted to only one percent of its real worth. In an attempt to embarrass the ex-King, the government paid the compensation from the Greek Natural Disasters Fund, thereby claiming that by paying out money to him he was harming Greek people in need. Constantine used the funds to set up the "Anna Maria Foundation" (named after his wife Queen Anne-Marie) to provide grants to needy Greeks in time of hardship caused by natural disasters.

When in 1973 the property was abandoned completely. Lack of funding resulted in the cows and horses dying of starvation in the stables. The buildings were subject to vandalism and looting, resulting in significant losses. A former cowshed was filled with objects from Rododafni Castle, the mansion at Psychico, Mon Repos palace, and other royal residences. With permission of the Government, in 1993, the ex-King was able to remove nine cargo crates of objects: some of this appeared at auction at Christies in 2007. There remained 17,000 objects, including antiquities, old masters, and a life-size portrait of Queen Anne-Marie that are now in storage at the Ministry of Culture.

Prospects
In June 2007, the Government of Greece said it intended to turn the former palace and grounds into a museum. However, it was reported in September 2012 that the government now intended to sell the palace and its estate in the face of mounting financial pressure. Founded in 2012, the "Friends of Tatoi Association" has set itself the goal to restore the former royal estate and convert it to a museum and public venue, while facing political indifference and lack of money.

In 2015 ten cars which were kept in the former royal estate of Tatoi, were designated as cultural monuments by the Central Council for Modern Monuments (ΚΣΝΜ). However, the cars, as well as the carriages (which were not included in the decision) remained in the ruins, with parts of the roof falling on the cars in 2016. However, as of 2020, the cars and carriages have now been removed and restored as part of greater restoration efforts by the Greek government.

For several years, the Greek government had no planned efforts for preservation of the Tatoi Palace, neighbouring buildings and the natural area around the Tatoi, and the estate suffered from extensive age and weather damage. The Greek state had renamed the area as metropolitan area. A political idea to convert the former royal estate to a private winery or a resort with restaurants and barbecue was met with criticism by private persons and organisations, who feared it could erase the historical elements of the property, and who preferred to open Tatoi as a museum for the public. The former royal estate of Polydendri is also completely abandoned, and the buildings are in a state of decay.

In late 2019, the Greek culture ministry moved ahead with plans to finally restore the palace. After approximately a year of conservation work had been undertaken, the Greek government announced that the estate would become a mixed-use development after the completion of restoration. Plans are centered on the conversion of the main house into a museum of the royal family, as well as the construction of a new luxury hotel and spa. The 2021 forest fires were catastrophic for the estate:  were burnt, with a fire breaking out in the Palace itself. While it was saved, two adjoining storage containers containing objects were destroyed. The area of the Royal Cemetery burned, but the Mausoleum and the Church of the Resurrection were saved. A number of estate buildings, including the Directorate building (which was being used to store furniture), the caretaker's house, the Telegraph Office and Sturm House, were lost. Following the death and funeral of Constantine II, it was announced by Lina Mendoni, the Minister of Culture and Sports, that the government intended to have Tatoi transformed into a museum by 2025. Points of interest are renovating the exterior and tidying up the royal gardens. The project comes following clean-up crews' efforts to tidy up Tatoi Palace and its surroundings for the burial of Constantine II.

Buried at Tatoi

Tatoi Royal Cemetery is a private cemetery located on the south end of the estate in a large wooded area.

Buried in the Tatoi Royal Cemetery are:
Princess Olga of Greece and Denmark (March 26, 1880 – 21 October 1880)
Princess Alexandra of Greece and Denmark, Grand Duchess of Russia (August 30, 1870 – September 24, 1891) -  (wife of Grand Duke Paul Alexandrovich of Russia)
George I of Greece (December 24, 1845 – March 18, 1913)
Alexander of Greece (August 1, 1893 – October 25, 1920)
Constantine I of Greece (August 2, 1868 – January 11, 1923)
Grand Duchess Olga Constantinovna of Russia, Queen of the Hellenes (September 3, 1851 – June 18, 1926) - (wife of George I of Greece)
Princess Sophia of Prussia, Queen of the Hellenes (June 14, 1870 – January 13, 1932) - (wife of Constantine I of Greece)
Prince Nicholas of Greece and Denmark (January 22, 1872 – February 8, 1938)
Prince Christopher of Greece and Denmark (August 10, 1888 – January 21, 1940)
Princess Maria of Greece and Denmark, Grand Duchess of Russia (March 3, 1876 – December 14, 1940) - (wife of Grand Duke George Mikhailovich of Russia)
Prince Andrew of Greece and Denmark (January 20, 1882 – December 3, 1944) (father of the Duke of Edinburgh, husband of Queen Elizabeth II)
George II of Greece (July 19, 1890 – April 1, 1947)
Princess Françoise of Orléans (December 25, 1902 – February 25, 1953) - (wife of Prince Christopher of Greece and Denmark)
Grand Duchess Elena Vladimirovna of Russia (January 17, 1882 – March 13, 1957) - (wife of Prince Nicholas of Greece and Denmark)
Prince George of Greece and Denmark (June 24, 1869 – November 25, 1957)
Princess Marie Bonaparte (July 2, 1882 – September 21, 1962) - (wife of Prince George of Greece and Denmark)
Paul of Greece (December 14, 1901 – March 6, 1964)
Aspasia Manos, Princess of Greece and Denmark (September 4, 1896 – August 7, 1972) - (wife of Alexander of the Hellenes)
 Princess Frederica of Hanover, Queen of the Hellenes (April 18, 1917 – February 6, 1981) -  (wife of Paul of Greece)
 Princess Katherine of Greece and Denmark, Lady Katherine Brandram  (May 4, 1913 – October 2, 2007) - (daughter of Constantine I of Greece, wife of Richard Brandram)
Constantine II of Greece (June 2, 1940 – January 10, 2023)

A mausoleum was built to house the bodies of Constantine I, Sophia and Alexander, seen in the image above. The remaining members are buried in tombs with crosses near the Royal Chapel.

Princess Alexandra of Greece and Denmark, Queen of Yugoslavia (March 25, 1921 – January 30, 1993) was buried here from 1993 until 2013, when her remains were exhumed and returned to Serbia, where they were reburied at Oplenac on 26 May 2013.

Climate
Tatoi has a mediterranean climate (Csa) with hot summers and cool winters.

European temperature record

Tatoi along with Elefsina currently hold the record for the highest ever recorded temperature in Europe according to WMO, with 48.0 °C, based on measurements made by the use of minimum/maximum thermometers.

See also
 Palataki (Thessaloniki)

References

Bibliography

 Kostas M. Stamatopoloulos, The Chronicle of Tatoi, Kapon Editions, Athens, 2015
 Kostas M. Stamatopoloulos, Tatoi: Tour In Time And Space, Kapon Editions, Athens, 2015

External links

Tatoi Palace Picture Gallery by photographer Christos Gorezis
Tatoi Estate: from extravagance to abandonment
 Tatoi Friends Association

Buildings and structures in East Attica
Burial sites of the House of Glücksburg
Burial sites of the House of Bonaparte
Cemeteries in Greece
Palaces in Greece
Burial sites of European royal families
Burial sites of the House of Holstein-Gottorp-Romanov
Royal residences in Greece